Hifzullah Khan was a noble of the Mughal Empire who was appointed governor of several Mughal provinces during the reign of Aurangzeb Alamgir in the late 17th century. He was a son of the famous Mughal Grand Vizier Sa'adullah Khan. He remained the Naib Subahdar of Punjab, Subahdar of Kashmir and later Sindh where he passed away.

References 

Mughal nobility